Per Hohle (5 December 1918 – 24 November 1999) was a Norwegian writer.

He was born in Østre Toten. He wrote numerous books on hunting, mountaineering, nature and the outdoors. Notable books are Trollelgen i Svefjellet (1970), Fra varde til varde (1971), Folk og skrømt i Vassfaret (1973), Finnskoger og skogfinner (1974), I bjørnemark og villfjell (1976), De møtte bjørnen (1977), Høyfjell og villmark (1987), Storviltjegere og storviltjakter (1990) and Gjeddekongen i Siksjølia (1993).

References

1918 births
1999 deaths
People from Østre Toten
Norwegian non-fiction writers
20th-century Norwegian writers
Norwegian nature writers
20th-century non-fiction writers